Harvey Township may refer to the following townships in the United States:

 Harvey Township, Meeker County, Minnesota
 Harvey Township, Cowley County, Kansas